IRHS is a four-letter acronym that may stand for:
 Iroquois Ridge High School, Oakville, Ontario
 Ironwood Ridge High School, Oro Valley, Arizona
 Indian River High School (disambiguation), several in the United States
 Institute of Research in Horticulture and Seeds, public organisation of agronomic research, France